Lansanya  is a town and sub-prefecture in the Dubreka Prefecture in the Kindia Region of western Guinea. As of 2014 it had a population of 9,191 people.

The residence of the late President of Guinea Lansana Conté is located in Lansanya. Conté was buried in front of his mansion on December 26, 2008.

References

Sub-prefectures of the Faranah Region